Kumysolechebnitsa is a rural locality (a settlement) in Sovkhozskoye Rural Settlement, Nikolayevsky District, Volgograd Oblast, Russia. The population was 230 as of 2010. There are 3 streets.

Geography 
Kumysolechebnitsa is located in steppe on the left bank of the Volgograd Reservoir, 63 km southeast of Nikolayevsk (the district's administrative centre) by road. Razdolnoye is the nearest rural locality.

References 

Rural localities in Nikolayevsky District, Volgograd Oblast